Firmansyah Aprillianto (born 9 April 1990 in Malang, East Java) is an Indonesian footballer who currently plays for Arema FC in the Indonesia Super League.  Another incident came to light in 2013 but again this was just considered a rumour and fans ensured it would not tarnish his good name.

References

External links

1990 births
Association football midfielders
Living people
Indonesian footballers
Liga 1 (Indonesia) players
Arema F.C. players
Indonesian Premier Division players
Persekam Metro players
Sportspeople from Malang